The Supercopa Argentina (English: Argentine Super Cup) is an official National association football cup of Argentina organized by the Argentine Football Association (AFA). The annual football match was played for the first time in 2012, being contested by the reigning champions of Primera División and Copa Argentina respectively.

History 
The idea of an Argentine "Supercup" came up in 2012 when the Argentine Football Association (AFA), in an attempt to bring innovation to the current system, established a competition that would be contested by champions of Primera División and Copa Argentina, taking inspiration from European cups.

The first Supercopa was held that same year when Boca Juniors (champion of Copa Argentina relaunched in 2011) faced Arsenal de Sarandí (champion of 2012 Torneo Clausura) at Estadio Bicentenario in San Fernando del Valle de Catamarca. As the match ended in a 0–0 draw, the winner was decided by penalty shoot-out, won by Arsenal 4–3 which allow the club to won its first national cup ever. Goalkeeper Cristian Campestrini was Arsenal's most valuable player after stopping three penalties.

For the second edition in 2012, AFA modified its statute to allow winner of 2013 Copa Campeonato (also named "Superfinal") to play against the winner of Copa Argentina. The "Superfinal" was a short-lived national cup contested by champions of Inicial and Final tournaments to decide the champion of the entire season. Although Copa Campeonato was in fact a national cup, the 2013 edition won by Vélez Sársfield to beating Newell's Old Boys was considered by AFA as a league title, therefore Vélez Sársfield played the Supercopa as Primera División champion.

As the 2019–20 Copa Argentina edition had been delayed due to covid 19 pandemic (it ended in December 2021, being won by Boca Juniors) the AFA did not held the 2020 Supercopa. Instead, the Association chose to held the 2021 edition, scheduling it for March 2022. Nevertheless, the match was not played due to scheduling problems.

In October 2022, it was announced that the Supercopa will be held in Abu Dhabi, United Arab Emirates, after an agreement between the Argentine Football Association (AFA) and the local Sports Council which includes four editions of the competition (up to 2026). Two months later, AFA announced that the winner of Trofeo de Campeones (Racing in 2022) would contest the tournament leaving the winner of Copa Argentina (Patronato in 2022) out of the competition. No reasons were given after the decision.

Finally the AFA created an international version of Supercopa Argentina named "Supercopa Internacional" to be held in Abu Dhabi to fulfil the previous commitment, contested between winners of Primera División and Trofeo de Campeones. On the other hand, the Supercopa Argentina will continue as usually.

List of champions 

Notes

Records

References

External links 
 

 
Argentina
Football competitions in Argentina